Khanderao Moreshwar 'Khandu' Rangnekar  (27 June 1917, in Bombay – 11 October 1984, in Thane, Maharashtra) was an Indian Test cricketer. Rangnekar was an attacking batsman who was considered the best Indian left-hander of his time. He was a good fielder at cover-point and could field with either hand.

Rangnekar started his first class career in the Bombay Pentangular and scored a hundred in his first appearance in the Ranji Trophy. He played in three Test matches against Australia in 1947–48 without much success.

Rangnekar was educated in the Byramji Jeejeebhoy School, St. Xaviers, and did his B.A. at Elphinstone College. Between 1939 and 1945 he was one of the best badminton players in India, winning the doubles title at the Indian National Badminton Championship in 1945.
He won Western India doubles in 1940, 1942, and 1944 and mixed doubles in 1940. He was the Thane municipality president in the 1960s.

He was the vice president of BCCI from 1962–63 to 1969–70, president of Bombay Cricket Association in 1962–63 and the vice president between 1962–63 and 1978–79.

He worked in the Indian Customs in Bombay and ran a textile store business. He died of throat cancer.

References
 Obituary in Indian Cricket 1985
 Christopher Martin-Jenkins, The Complete Who's Who of Test Cricketers

External links
 Cricinfo Profile
 CricketArchive Profile
 Question on Khandu Rangnekar on Ask Steven

India Test cricketers
Indian cricketers
Mumbai cricketers
Hindus cricketers
Maharashtra cricketers
Holkar cricketers
Madhya Pradesh cricketers
West Zone cricketers
Central Zone cricketers
1984 deaths
1917 births
People from Thane
Cricketers from Mumbai
Indian male badminton players
Indian national badminton champions
Marathi sportspeople
Racket sportspeople from Mumbai